The Cancer Treatment Centers of America Championship at Surprise is a professional tennis tournament which is part of the Outback Champions Series. Its inaugural event took place on November 5–9, 2008, in Surprise, Arizona, a suburb of Phoenix, Arizona.

Finals results

External links
 Official website

Champions Series (senior men's tennis tour)
Tennis tournaments in the United States
Cancer awareness
Cancer fundraisers
Sports in Surprise, Arizona
2008 establishments in Arizona